Events from the year 1905 in the United States.

Incumbents

Federal Government 
 President: Theodore Roosevelt (R-New York)
 Vice President: vacant (until March 4), Charles W. Fairbanks (R-Indiana) (starting March 4)
 Chief Justice: Melville Fuller (Illinois)
 Speaker of the House of Representatives: Joseph Gurney Cannon (R-Illinois)
 Congress: 58th (until March 4), 59th (starting March 4)

Events

January–June
 January 30 – The Supreme Court renders its unanimous decision in the landmark case of Swift & Co. v. United States, allowing the federal government to regulate monopolies.
 March 4 – President Theodore Roosevelt begins his first full term. Charles W. Fairbanks is sworn in as Vice President of the United States.
 March 10 – In Cleveland, Ohio, Cassie Chadwick is sentenced for 14 years in prison for fraud.
 March 17 – Franklin D. Roosevelt marries his fifth cousin Eleanor Roosevelt; President Roosevelt, the bride's uncle, gives her away.
 March 20 – Grover Shoe Factory disaster: A boiler explosion, building collapse and fire in Brockton, Massachusetts kills 58.
 March 27 – Plumas National Forest is established.
 April 6 – Lochner v. New York: The Supreme Court of the United States invalidates New York's 8-hour-day law.
 April 6–July 19 – The 1905 Chicago Teamsters' strike; 21 people die and 416 are injured in the violence.
 May–June – John C. Merriam leads the Saurian Expedition, a paleontological research mission in northern Nevada.
 May 6 – Klamath National Forest is established.
 May 10 – The 1905 Snyder, Oklahoma tornado destroys much of Snyder, Oklahoma, killing at least 97.
 May 12 – Gunnison National Forest is established.
 May 15 – Las Vegas, Nevada is founded when , in what later becomes downtown, are auctioned off.
 May 29 – Sawtooth National Forest is established.
 June 1–October 14 – The Lewis and Clark Centennial Exposition is held in Portland, Oregon, celebrating the 100th anniversary of the Lewis and Clark Expedition.
 June 2 – Lassen National Forest is established.
 June 3 – San Juan and Payette National Forest is established.
 June 14 – Uncompahgre National Forest is established.
 June 24 – The founding convention of the Industrial Workers of the World, A radical workers union, which had great impact during the first two decades of the 20th century.

July–December

 July 11 – W. E. B. Du Bois and William Monroe Trotter establish the Niagara Movement, a precursor to the NAACP.
 July 29 – U.S. Secretary of War William Howard Taft has talks with Prime Minister of Japan Katsura Taro. Notes from these conversations (known as the Taft–Katsura Agreement) are later found in 1924 and cause a controversy as it appears to contain U.S. recognition of Japan's claims in Korea.
 September 5 – Russo-Japanese War – Treaty of Portsmouth: In New Hampshire, a treaty mediated by U.S. President Theodore Roosevelt is signed by victor Japan and Russia. Russia cedes the island of Sakhalin and port and rail rights in Manchuria to Japan.
 September 11 – 19 die and 48 are seriously injured when the Ninth Avenue Elevated train derails in Manhattan.
 October – John W. Taylor and Matthias F. Cowley resign from the Quorum of Twelve in protest, disputing the Church of Jesus Christ of Latter-day Saints' stance against polygamy that was reaffirmed in the Second Manifesto (following the Reed Smoot hearings).
 October 3 – Tonto National Forest is established.
 October 5 – The Wright Brothers' third aeroplane (Wright Flyer III) stays in the air for 39 minutes with Wilbur piloting. This is the first aeroplane flight lasting over half an hour.
 October 11 – The Institute of Musical Art, predecessor of the Juilliard School, opens in New York City.

 November 28-29 – The massive Mataafa Storm on the Great Lakes damages or destroys 29 vessels. 

 December 30 – A bomb kills Frank Steunenberg, ex-governor of Idaho; the case leads to a trial against leaders of the Western Federation of Miners.

Undated
 Refilling of Salton Sea begins.
 Huckleberry Finn and Tom Sawyer are banned from the Brooklyn Public Library for setting a "bad example."

Ongoing
 Progressive Era (1890s–1920s)
 Lochner era (c. 1897–c. 1937)
 Black Patch Tobacco Wars (1904–1909)

Sport 

October 14 -  the National League's New York Giants won their 1st World Series by defeating the American League's Philadelphia Athletics 4 games to 1 New York City's Polo Grounds

Births
 January 3 – Anna May Wong, film actress (died 1961)
 January 7 – James Simpson Jr.,  race car driver and politician (died 1960)
 January 11 – Dorothy Hale, socialite (suicide 1938)
 January 27 – Howard McNear, actor (died 1969)
 February 6 – Merze Tate, African American academic (died 1996)
 March 15 – Nat Perrin, comedy screenwriter (died 1998)
 March 17 – Lillian Yarbo, actress (died 1996)
 April 9 – J. William Fulbright, U.S. Senator from Arkansas from 1945 to 1974 (died 1995)
 May 15 – Joseph Cotten, actor (died 1994)
 May 16 – Henry Fonda, actor (died 1982)
 May 18 – Ruth Alexander, pioneering American pilot (died 1930)
 June 10 – Sally Childs, language training specialist (died 1988)
 June 20 – Lillian Hellman, playwright (born 1984)
 July 4 – Irving Johnson, sailor and author (died 1991)
 July 15 – Dorothy Fields, lyricist (died 1974)
 July 18 – Robert Elton Brooker, business executive (died 2000)
 July 21 – David M. Kennedy, U.S. 60th Secretary of Treasury, 8th U.S. Representative to N.A.T.O., Special Representative of The First Presidency of The Church of Jesus Christ and Latter-day Saints (died 1996)
 August 2 – Ruth Nelson, actress (died 1992)
 August 23 – Abbie Rowe, White House photographer (died 1967)
 October 5 – John Hoyt, actor, editorial board member of The Yale Record (died 1991)
 October 6 – Helen Wills, tennis player (died 1998)
 October 7 – Andy Devine, character actor (died 1977)
 October 11 – Fred Trump, real estate developer, father of Donald Trump (died 1999)
 October 23 – Gertrude Ederle, swimmer (died 2003)
 November 1 – Eric Siday, bandleader, electronic composer (died 1976)
 November 3 – Joseph H. Ball, U.S. Senator from Minnesota from 1940 to 1942 and 1943 to 1949 (died 1993)
 November 4 – Nannie Doss, serial killer who murdered eleven people (died 1965)
 November 13 – Frank Levingston, supercentenarian (died 2016)
 November 19
 Eleanor Audley, actress (died 1991)
 Tommy Dorsey, bandleader (died 1956)
 November 26 – Bob Johnson, baseball player (died 1982)
 November 27 – Astrid Allwyn, actress (died 1978)
 December 7 – Leonard Goldenson, television executive (died 1999)
 December 23 – Paul Caraway, general, High Commissioner, United States Civil Administration of the Ryukyu Islands (died 1985)
 December 24 – Howard Hughes, business magnate, investor, director, pilot, and philanthropist (died  1976}

Deaths
 January 2 – Clara Augusta Jones Trask, dime novelist (born 1839)
 January 6
Ann Eliza Smith, patriot (born 1819)
George Van Cleaf, swimmer and water polo player (born 1880)
 January 19 – Benjamin F. Rice, U.S. Senator from Arkansas from 1868 to 1873 (born 1828)
 January 22 – Clara Harrison Stranahan, college co-founder and trustee  (born 1831)
 January 27 – Watson Heston, cartoonist (born 1846)
 January 28 – Cordelia A. Greene, physician, reformer, benefactor (born 1831)
 February 8 – John Leary, politician, 37th Mayor of Seattle (born 1837)
 February 15 – Lew Wallace, Union general in the American Civil War and politician (born 1827)
 February 20 – Jeremiah W. Farnham, merchant captain (born c. 1828)
 February 27 – George S. Boutwell, U.S. Senator from Massachusetts from 1851 to 1853 (born 1818)
 March 1 – Edward O. Wolcott, U.S. Senator from Colorado from 1889 to 1901 (born 1848)
 March 6 – John Henninger Reagan, U.S. Senator from Texas, Acting Confederate States Secretary of the Treasury, Confederate States Postmaster General (born 1818)
 March 9 – William B. Bate, 23rd Governor of Tennessee from 1883 to 1887 and U.S. Senator from Tennessee from 1887 to 1905 (born 1826)
 March 18 – Joseph Roswell Hawley, U.S. Senator from Connecticut from 1881 to 1905 (born 1826)
 April 21 – Orville H. Platt, U.S. Senator from Connecticut from 1879 to 1905 (born 1827)
 May 5 – William M. Robbins, U.S. Representative from North Carolina (born 1828)
 May 13 – Sam S. Shubert, theater owner (born 1878)
 May 23 – Mary Livermore, journalist, abolitionist and women's rights advocate (born 1820)
 July 1 – John Hay, author, biographer and 37th United States Secretary of State (born 1838)
 July 24 – Adolf Cluss, engineer architect (born 1825 in Germany)
 August 1 – Andrew Wylie, judge (born 1814)
 August 21 – Mary Mapes Dodge, children's author (b. 1831)
 September 5 – Touch the Clouds, Minneconjou chief (b. c. 1838)
 September 12 – John Rogan, second tallest person in recorded history (b. 1868)
 October 6 – Hibbard H. Shedd, politician and novelist (born 1847)
 December 3 – John Bartlett, lexicographer and publisher (born 1820)

See also
 List of American films of 1905
 Timeline of United States history (1900–1929)

References

External links
 

 
1900s in the United States
United States
United States
Years of the 20th century in the United States